Danaid is a sculpture by Auguste Rodin, based on the account in the Metamorphoses of Hypermnestra, eldest of the Danaïdes.

Gates of Hell
It was originally conceived as part of his The Gates of Hell but was not included in the final version of that work. It is based on Andromeda, also from Gates.

Versions
Originally produced in 1890 in marble, bronze casts of Danaid began to be produced in 1891 and are in collections in France as well as the Museo Soumaya in Mexico City.

A more modern casting can be found in the permanent collection of the Peoria Riverfront Museum, in Peoria, Illinois, USA, a gift of preeminent Rodin collector B. Gerald Cantor in honor of Carlotta and Gary Bielfeldt in 1987.

See also
List of sculptures by Auguste Rodin

References

External links

1890 sculptures
1891 sculptures
Marble sculptures
Bronze sculptures
Sculptures of the Museo Soumaya
Sculptures by Auguste Rodin
Sculptures of the Musée Rodin
Bronze sculptures in Mexico
Sculptures based on Metamorphoses
Nude sculptures